Salty's Lighthouse is an American animated television series for preschoolers. The series was produced by Sunbow Entertainment and aired from October 3, 1997, to June 26, 1998, on TLC. in association with the Bank Street College of Education in New York. The show centers on a young boy named Salty, as he plays and learns with his friends in a magical lighthouse. As well as the animated adventures of Salty and his friends, the series uses live-action footage from the British children's television series Tugs for various segments. 40 episodes were produced in the series.

Overview
Salty is a young redheaded boy who loves using his imagination. Each day, he goes to the lighthouse near his home to play with his seaside friends: Ocho, the octopus; Claude, the hermit crab; Sophie and Sadie, the twin birds; a group of small clams; Aurora, the light that shines over the ocean; and lighthouse owner Aunt Chovie. Through their adventures in each episode, they learn good lessons that help them overcome their problems. Tied into each story are other segments, told through live-action footage:

 Through the eyes of Seymour (a walking pair of binoculars), the characters look out beyond the lighthouse to see what the tugboats in the harbour are doing. Their stories relate to the situations of the main characters. The tugboat footage consists of live model animation, taken from the British television series Tugs (see below for more information).
 Some episodes include a segment called 'Salty's Song Time' introduced by the lighthouse clock. These consist of original songs, which relate the lesson of the episode. The songs are set to an arrangement of footage, mainly from archival libraries and silent films including Charlie Chaplin, Commando Cody & specially added animation for some scenes in the songs.

Voice cast
Rhys Huber as Salty
Kathleen Barr as Ocho and Aunt Chovie
Janyse Jaud as Sophie and Sadie (The Seagull Sisters)
Andrea Libman as Claude
Lenore Zann as 
Aurora
Sunshine
Captain Star
Lillie Lightship
Little Ditcher
and Sally Seaplane
Ian James Corlett as
Ten Cents
Otis
Zeebee
Zip 
Lord Stinker
Frank
Eddie
and Lighthouse Clock
Paul Dobson as 
Big Stack
Hercules
Captain Zero
Izzy Gomez
Sea Rogue
Billy Shoepack
Mr. Boffo
Mr. Socko
Cappy
Tramper
Old Rusty
Scoop
O. Krappenschmitt
Stoney
and Chooch
French Tickner as
Top Hat
Warrior
Grampus
Steamer
and Scuttlebutt Pete
Scott McNeil as 
Zorran
Zak
Zug
Bluenose
Boomer
and the Fultan Ferry

Episodes
Mixed Signals! (October 3, 1997)
Too Young to Be Included! (October 10, 1997)
Taking Off! (October 17, 1997)
Let's Party! (October 24, 1997)
Blackout (October 31, 1997)
Eight is Too Much (November 7, 1997)
One Bad Day (November 14, 1997)
Hands Off! (November 21, 1997)
Salty, Come Lately! (November 28, 1997)
It's Magic (December 5, 1997)
Count on Me (December 12, 1997)
Knot So Nice (December 19, 1997)
Taking My Turn (December 26, 1997)
Backwards Day (January 2, 1998)
Banana Splits (January 9, 1998)
Clear the Decks (January 16, 1998)
Claude in Charge (January 23, 1998)
The Favorite (January 30, 1998)
Strike Up the Band (February 6, 1998)
Blankety Blank (February 13, 1998)
The Last of the Red Hot Seagulls (February 20, 1998)
Farley Frog (February 27, 1998)
Boss Man (March 6, 1998)
Sophie, Come Home! (March 13, 1998)
Who Took My Crayons? (March 20, 1998)
High Spirits! (March 27, 1998)
Some Guys Have All the Luck! (April 3, 1998)
Dream On! (April 10, 1998)
Sound Off (April 17, 1998)
Treasure Hunt (April 24, 1998)
Who Turned Off the Lights? (May 1, 1998)
If the Clue Fits, Wear It! (May 8, 1998)
Desperately Seeking Sadie (May 14, 1998)
Colossal Crab (May 15, 1998)
The Big Birthday Splash (May 22, 1998)
Stop the Music! (May 29, 1998)
Let's Wing It! (June 5, 1998)
No Strings Attached! (June 12, 1998)
Guilty Gull (June 19, 1998)
Bivalve Blues (June 26, 1998)

Broadcast
The series premiered on October 3, 1997 and ended on June 26, 1998 on TLC (part of Ready Set Learn block) in the United States, but aired in reruns until February 23, 2003. Internationally, it aired on Channel 4 in the UK, MBC 3 in the Middle East, Dubai 33 in the Emirates, Fox Kids in Australia, Bahrain TV Channel 55 in Bahrain, SABC2 in South Africa, TV3 in Ireland, TVN in Poland, TV Cultura in Brazil, the Arutz HaYeladim in Israel, TeleAsturias in Spain, BFBS (which is seen in several countries such as Germany, Falkland Islands, Gibraltar, Belize, and Bosnia), CBC Television and SCN in Canada, Prime 12 in Singapore, Playhouse Disney in Taiwan and UBC Kids in Thailand, in addition, also airing on CVM Television in Jamaica.

Home Video releases

United States
In 1999, Interactive Learning Group (under license from Sunbow and Sony Wonder) released three VHS tapes containing two episodes each (1 full episode) for their Video Buddy Interactive System.

In 2012, episodes are available online on Kidobi, a video streaming site for preschool content.

United Kingdom
In November 2000, Maverick released a VHS tape of the series containing six episodes (3 full episodes).

In 2005, Metrodome Distribution (a distributor owned by Sunbow's then-parent TV-Loonland AG) released a compilation VHS/DVD called "Toddler Time!", which included the two episodes 'Taking Off' and 'Let's Party' (making one full episode).

Comparisons with Tugs

The segments featuring the tugboats in the harbour used footage from the British television series Tugs, a series produced in 1989 by Robert D. Cardona and David Mitton, who (along with Britt Allcroft) produced the popular series Thomas the Tank Engine & Friends. Whilst Allcroft drove the Thomas series to popularity among U.S. audiences (through the PBS series Shining Time Station), Tugs did not spread far beyond its country of origin, lasting one season of 13 episodes due to the bankruptcy of its distributor, TVS Television (although it was aired and merchandised in the Japanese and Australian markets).

As a result of this, Sunbow saw fit to use the series' animation as a part of Salty's Lighthouse, licensing the use of the footage from Cardona: however, they repurposed the footage drastically to suit the needs of Salty's Lighthouse - a show intended for the U.S. preschool market. (Cardona was not involved in the show's production; however, he was credited as the creator of the model footage.)

The original episodes of Tugs centered on two rival fleets of tugboats, working in 'Bigg City Port' during the 1920s, with its plotlines involving action and drama intended for an older audience of children. Due to the difference in the intended demographic, the original plotlines (as well as the premise of rival tug fleets) were not used. Instead, the producers of Salty's Lighthouse wrote entirely new stories of the boats in 'Snugboat Harbor', relating to the theme of the main animated segment, with footage from the series edited and redubbed to tell these stories.

(This creates an interesting comparison to the Thomas segments of Shining Time Station; as Britt Allcroft intended to introduce Thomas to America through that series, so the UK terms used in that series, i.e. trucks, were modified to reflect the US terms, but the episodes were still faithful to their source. In the case of Salty's Lighthouse, the show was completely repurposed for a new market, instead of attempting to create a faithful 'equivalent' of Tugs.)

Along with the newly created stories, various changes were made to the characters featured in them. The characters of Sunshine, Captain Star (the narrator), and Little Ditcher were made female, presumably to appeal to a wider audience of children. (Sunshine was referred to in some episodes as fellow switcher Ten Cents' sister.)

The U.S. accents of the new voiceover replaced a range of British accents from the original characters (for example, the Glaswegian Scottish of Big Mac, or the Cockney accents of Ten Cents and Zorran).

Some character names were also changed, usually to avoid confusion with others of the same name: Of the main characters, Big Mac became 'Big Stack' (possibly to avoid legal trouble from McDonald's over the name of their well-known burger).; O.J. became 'Otis' (possibly to avoid confusion with O. J. Simpson or the fact that O.J. can stand for the orange juice drink).; while Zebedee became 'Zeebee' (his original nameplate is left uncensored which indicates his name may have been consistently mispronounced).

Izzy Gomez had an U.S. accent instead of a Mexican one, despite having the sombrero.

The Fultan Ferry was given a voice (despite not having a visible face or megaphone), and was confirmed as a male character. He also went under the name 'Fultan' by Grampus.
 
Excluding the human characters, most of the faceless characters (such as Little Ditcher, Scuttlebutt Pete, and Puffa) don't speak through their visible megaphones (with the exception of Tramper (Nantucket) in "Salty Come Lately").

Many supporting and incidental characters were also repurposed, to fit particular Salty's Lighthouse stories:

Johnny Cuba, a smuggler, was written as 'Steamer', a friendly character.
Sea Rogue was used as a villain, stealing cargo and only appearing in a dream of Top Hat's.
Two different characters, Coast Guard and the Coast Guard's Messenger, were merged into a single character named 'Cappy'.
Puffa became ''The Train" or "Chooch".
Jack the Grappler became 'Scoop'.
The scrap dealers, Burke and Blair, became movie producers named 'Mr. Boffo' and 'Mr. Socko'. 
Nantucket went under the name 'Tramper', and also became a friendly character. Sometimes he appeared in speaking parts, and sometimes only communicated through a foghorn.
The Quarry Master gained the name 'Stoney'.

Some of the other characters (such as the Fire Tug, Big Mickey, Mighty Mo, Pearl,  the Shrimpers, and the Buoys) do make several appearances, but don't have any dialogue whilst some such as Sea Rogue's Uncle and the Pirates (a.k.a. The Green-Eyed Things) never made any appearances (although Sea Rogue's Uncle did appear as a cameo in the episode "Who Took My Crayons?", and one of the Pirates was shown in the place of Sea Rogue when he covered Lillie Lightship and a bell buoy with a blanket in the episode "Dream On").

See also
 Tugs, the British series made into a segment of the show
 Thomas & Friends, and its U.S. counterpart Shining Time Station
 Theodore Tugboat, a Canadian children's series, also starring tugboat characters

Notes

References

External links

1990s American animated television series
1990s American children's television series
1997 American television series debuts
1998 American television series endings
American children's animated adventure television series
American children's animated fantasy television series
American preschool education television series
American television series with live action and animation
Animated television series about children
Animated preschool education television series
1990s preschool education television series
Television series by Sunbow Entertainment
Television series by Sony Pictures Television
Works set in lighthouses
PBS Kids shows
PBS original programming
TLC (TV network) original programming
CBC Television original programming
English-language television shows